Rodu Sultan is a town of Tehsil 18 Hazari Jhang District in the Punjab province of Pakistan.

Rodu Sultan is a big town of Punjab in the district of Jhang. Shrine of Sultan Bahoo  & Rodu sultan is located near the town of Rodu Sultan. Most of the population speaks Punjabi here. Rodu Sultan Its elevation is 150 meters (495 feet) above sea level. Postal Code or ZIP Code of Rodu Sultan is 35160 and nearest GPO is Jhang GPO. Rodu Sultan is the part of PP-82, Punjab Provincial Assembly Region 82.

References to

Populated places in Jhang District
Jhang District